The Book of Fixed Stars (literally The Book of the Shapes of Stars) is an astronomical text written by Abd al-Rahman al-Sufi (Azophi) around 964. Following the translation movement in the 9th century AD, the book was written in Arabic, the common language for scholars across the vast Islamic territories, although the author himself was Persian. It was an attempt to create a synthesis of the comprehensive star catalogue in Ptolemy’s Almagest (books VII and VIII) with the indigenous Arabic astronomical traditions on the constellations (notably the Arabic constellation system of the Anwā’). The original manuscript no longer survives as an autograph, however, the importance of tradition and the practice of diligence central to Islamic manuscript tradition have ensured the survival of the Book of Stars in later-made copies.

Historical context 
The treatise was written in the Persian city of Shiraz, for the patron and Buyid emir ‘Abud al-Dawla. Although al-Sufi made his longitudinal calculations correct for the year 964 only, the work remained highly influential, functioning as the standard text on Arabic astronomy to be consulted in all Islamic territories and faithfully copied for many centuries after its production. Since it was only correct for the single year of 964, the Book of Fixed Stars was intended to serve a broader educational purpose, rather than being concerned with the mathematical technicalities of astronomy.

The Book of Fixed Stars is representative of the concerns of Islamic scholars during the late-9th to 11th Centuries AD, where following the translation of Hellenistic texts from Greek to Arabic, "Islamic astronomers and astrologers concentrated on analyzing, criticizing, and perfecting the geometrical models of Ptolemy". Medieval Islamic astronomers also drew from Sanskrit and Middle Persian sources to learn "methods for calculating the position of heavenly bodies, and for creating tables recording the movement of the sun, the moon, and the five known planets." In the context of this shift to observational and theoretical astronomy set in motion by the translation movement, and with al-Sufi himself being an observational astronomer, the Book of Fixed Stars comprises an important organisation and revision of classical knowledge from antiquity (the first of its kind), and some of the earliest surviving examples of visual documentation of celestial bodies observable by the naked eye.

The interest in cataloging the stars also stems from the nature of worship in Islam. The religion requires that its members are able to locate Mecca so that they may pray in the right direction, and to also be able to determine the correct times for prayer. In addition to the daily requirements, during the festival of Ramadan they must also know the moments of sunrise and sunset for fasting, and the location of the moon for the start of each month.

The Book of Fixed Stars also follows a trend of increased production of illustrated manuscripts, as it is one of the oldest surviving treatises of its kind. This is not to say that this text was the first illustrated manuscript ever created, as there are many illustrated fragments that have been found and studied, most notably the Fustat fragments. The Fustat fragments are illustrated scraps of parchment that were found during excavations in Fustat, or Old Cairo. These fragments can be attributed to the stylings of the Fatimid period (969-1171), therefore dating the existence of astronomical illustrations to many years before the creation of the Book of Fixed Stars. The increase in illustrated manuscripts is also related to the advent of paper in the Islamic world in the tenth century. The increased availability of paper, which was much cheaper than parchment, drove the production of books in the Islamic world.

Contents 
The book was thoroughly illustrated along with observations and descriptions of the stars, their positions (copied from Ptolemy's Almagest with the longitudes increased by 12° 42' to account for the precession), their magnitudes (brightness) and their color. Notably, al-Sufi improved upon Ptolemy's system for measuring star brightness. Instead of two brightness categories (‘more bright’ and ‘less bright’), al-Sufi employed three: AṢghareh (‘less’), Akbareh (‘greater’), and A’ẓameh (‘much-greater’). Ihsan Hafez has recorded 132 stars in al-Sufi's work not mentioned by Ptolemy.

Al-Sufi's results, as in Ptolemy's Almagest, were set out constellation by constellation. For each constellation, he provided two drawings, one from the outside of a celestial globe, and the other from the inside. Al-Sufi's reasoning for this was that ‘the beholder might be confused if he saw the figure on the globe differing from what he sees in the sky’, demonstrating the book's use as a teaching device. Persis Berkelamp argues that each paired constellation was drawn slightly differently to encourage students to study the manuscript closely.

Composition

Introduction 
In his introduction, al-Sufi dedicates the work to his patron 'Abud al-Dawla and outlines the sources he has used to write the book. These sources, including a number of treatises and objects which are now lost, serve as important indicators and records of the knowledge ('ilm) production at the time. For instance, the introduction lists the names of 3 authors (Ibn Kunasa, Ibn al-'Arabi, Abu Hanifa al-Dinawari) and their treatises concerning pre-Islamic Bedouin traditions, all of which are now lost.

Chapters 
The Book of Fixed Stars follows the 48 Ptolemaic constellations described in the Almagest, with a chapter dedicated to each individual constellation. Each chapter is split into 4 subsections.

Ptolemaic constellations 
Each chapter begins with a description of the specified constellation and the stars that make up each grouping, thus departing from the Almagest and its concern for describing the iconographical origins of each constellation outline in Greek mythology. Here, al-Sufi is often critical of Ptolemy for seemingly prioritising the constellation outline over the actual stars in a constellation grouping, with some stars being overlooked. In making these revisions, al-Sufi was able to determine the boundaries for each constellation's star grouping.

Indigenous Arabic constellations 
Al-Sufi continues his description of the specified constellation in terms of the Pre-Islamic Bedouin constellations and star groupings, noting their positions and distance to the Ptolemaic constellation stars.

Illustrations 
In this section, al-Sufi presents 2 different views/illustrations of the specified Ptolemaic constellations: the constellation viewed in the sky from the ground and the constellation as viewed on top of a globe. The latter view can be explained by accounts of al-Sufi's drawing process, whereby the author carefully fitted a thin sheet of paper on top of a celestial globe and then directly copied the constellation outlines and star positions from the engravings. The inclusion of this globe view of each constellation also suggests that the Books of Fixed Stars was intended to be used by owners of celestial globes, and many surviving globes from the 13th and 14th Centuries include statements attesting to the treatise as an influential source.

Although al-Sufi names several sources in his introduction which contributed to the book's illustrations, none of these treatises nor celestial globes survive. These illustrations represent another important departure from the Almagest which does not include any illustrations.

Star Catalogue 
The book includes a comprehensive catalogue of the individual stars, modified and extended from that of the Almagest, and including revised star magnitude values.

Influence 
The work was highly influential and survives in numerous manuscripts and translations. The oldest manuscript, kept in the Bodleian Library, dates to 1009 and is allegedly the work of the author's son, though this is disputed. There is a thirteenth-century copy in the British Library (Or. 5323).

He has the earliest known descriptions and illustrations of what he called "a little cloud", which is actually the Andromeda Galaxy. He mentions it as lying before the mouth of a Big Fish, an Arabic constellation. This "cloud" was apparently commonly known to the Isfahan astronomers, very probably before 905, and al-Sufi attributes their discoveries in the text. This was the first galaxy to be observed, as distinct from a star cluster.

It has been claimed that the first recorded mention of the Large Magellanic Cloud was given in the Book of Fixed Stars but this seems to be a misunderstanding of a reference to some stars south of Canopus which he admits he has not seen.

He probably also cataloged the Omicron Velorum star cluster as a "nebulous star", and an additional "nebulous object" in Vulpecula, a cluster now variously known as Al-Sufi's Cluster, the "Coathanger asterism", Brocchi's Cluster or Collinder 399.

The book has been translated into French by Hans Schjellerup in 1874  and into English by Ihsan Hafez.

Editions
 Text and French translation of Ṣūfī's introduction by J. J. A. Caussin de Perceval in Notices et extraits des manuscrits XII, Paris, 1831, pp. 236f.
 H.C.F.C. Schjellerup, Description des étoiles fixes par Abd-al-Rahman al-Sûfi, St. Petersburg, 1874. Complete French translation from two late mss., with selected portions in Arabic.
 Ketāb ṣowar al-kawākeb al-ṯābeta, edited from five mss., and accompanied by the Orǰūza of Ebn al-Ṣūfī, Hyderabad, India, 1954 (introduction  by H. J. J. Winter).
 Facsimile edition of the Persian translation by Naṣīr-al-dīn Ṭūsī (Ayasofya 2595, autograph, from Uluḡ Beg's library), Tehran, 1348 Š./1969.
 Critical edition  of Ṭūsī's translation by Sayyed Moʿezz-al-dīn Mahdavī, Tehran, 1351 Š./1972.
 The star nomenclature of the Castilian version, and of an Italian translation made from Castilian, was critically edited by O. J. Tallgren, "Los nombres árabes de las estrelas y la transcripción alfonsina", in Homenaje a R. Menéndez Pidal II, Madrid, 1925, with 'Correcciones y adiciones' in Revista de filología española 12, 1925, pp. 52f.
 The Italian translation was edited by P. Knecht, I libri astronomici di Alfonso X in una versione fiorentina del trecento, Saragossa, 1965.
English translation; Hafez, Ihsan (2010) Abd al-Rahman al-Sufi and his book of the fixed stars: a journey of re-discovery. PhD thesis, James Cook University.

References 

Paul Kunitzsch, The Arabs and the Stars: Texts and Traditions on the Fixed Stars, and Their Influence in Medieval Europe (Variorum Reprint, Cs307)
Paul Kunitzsch, Arabische Sternnamen in Europa, Wiesbaden, 1959, pp. 230f.
Paul Kunitzsch, "Ṣūfī Latinus", Zeitschrift der Deutschen Morgenländische Gesellschaft, 115, 1965, pp. 65–74.
Paul Kunitzsch, "Al-Ṣūfī" in: Dictionary of Scientific Biography, XIII, New York, 1976, pp. 149–50.
 J. Upton, "A Manuscript of “The Book of the Fixed Stars” by ʿAbd ar-Raḥmān aṣ-Ṣūfī", Metropolitan Museum Studies, 4, 1933, pp. 179–97.
E. Wellesz, An Islamic Book of Constellations, Oxford, 1965.
H. J. J. Winter, "Notes on al-Kitab Suwar Al-Kawakib", Archives Internationales d’Histoire des Sciences, 8, 1955, pp. 126–33.

External links

Bodleian copy of Suwar al-Kawakib al-Thabitah (Book of fixed Stars)
Biography of Al Sufi
Copy (dated c. 1730) of al-Sufi's Book of the Fixed Stars
Ulugh Beg in www.atlascoelestis.com
Liber locis stellarum fixarum, 964, manoscritto del 1417 riprodotto il 1730 in www.atlascoelestis.com
Pergamenthandschrift M II 141 in www.atlascoelestis.com
A page about Muslim Astronomers
Al-Sufi's constellations
Al-Ṣūfī’s Book of the Constellations of the Fixed Stars and its Influence on Islamic and Western Celestial Cartography - includes a detailed bibliography and a list of all known manuscripts of al-Ṣūfī's Book of the Fixed Stars.
Forgotten History: Al-Sufi's Book Of Fixed Stars Slides and audio recording from a presentation on the book, with images and quotations from many different manuscripts. 
Illustrations from Book of Fixed Stars (Kitāb suwar al-kawākib al-ṯābita) by ‛Abd al-Rahman ibn ‛Umar al-Ṣūfī.
Moya Carey, Painting the Stars in a Century of Change: A thirteenth-century copy of al-Sufi's "Treatise on the Fixed Stars" - British Library Or.5323

10th-century Arabic books
Astronomical catalogues of stars
Astronomical works of the medieval Islamic world
Scientific works of the Abbasid Caliphate
Classical star atlases
964